Olympiacos sailing department was established in 1963 and since then has won Olympic distinctions (three gold, one silver and two bronze medals), two gold medals in World Championships as well as one gold, two silver and one bronze medal in European Championships. The sailing department successfully organized the Finn Gold Cup in Athens in 1998 and in 2002 at the club's marine training facilities in Alexandras Square, Piraeus. The leading athlete in the FINN Category is World Champion and Olympiacos athlete, Emilios Papathanasiou .

Honours
(Total Titles: 50)

 Greek Championship Group Score: 1
 1954

Men

 Dragon: 3
 1970, 1971, 1972
 Finn: 23
 1958, 1972, 1973, 1974, 1976, 1977, 1978, 1979, 1980, 1982, 1996, 1997, 1998, 1999, 2000, 2001, 2002, 2003, 2004, 2005, 2006, 2007, 2008
 Laser: 2
 1976, 1978
 Soling: 11
 1980, 1982, 1983, 1984, 1985, 1986, 1987, 1989, 1992, 1993, 2000[18]
 Star: 7
 1985, 1986, 1987, 1995, 2009, 2010, 2011
 Hellenic Marine Association (E.Θ.Ε): 1
 1958

Women

 470: 1
 2009
 420: 1
 2010

References

External links
http://www.olympiacos.org/amateurs-history

Sailing
Sailing in Greece